Aleksandr or Alexander Sokolov may refer to:
 Aleksandr Sokolov (footballer), Russian football striker
 Aleksandr Sokolov (painter, born 1829) (1829–1913), Russian portrait painter
 Aleksandr Sokolov (painter, born 1918) (1918–1973), Russian painter
 Aleksandr Sokolov (politician) (born 1949), Russian politician and former minister
 Alexander Sokolov (sculptor) (born 1955), Russian-born sculptor, resident in Spain
 Aleksandr Sokolov (sprinter) (born 1971), Soviet-Russian track and field sprinter
 Aleksandr Sokolov (sport shooter) (born 1952), Soviet sports shooter
 Aleksandr Sokolov (volleyball) (born 1982), Russian volleyball player
Sasha Sokolov (born 1943), Canadian writer

See also
Alexandra Sokoloff, American novelist and screenwriter